August Gunnarsson (born March 31, 1996) is a Swedish ice hockey player. He is currently playing with HC Vita Hästen of the HockeyAllsvenskan (Allsv).

Gunnarsson made his Swedish Hockey League debut playing with Färjestad BK during the 2014–15 SHL season.

References

External links

1996 births
Living people
Färjestad BK players
Swedish ice hockey forwards
HC Vita Hästen players
Sportspeople from Örebro